Sir Kingsford Dibela  (16 March 1932 – 22 March 2002) was a Papua New Guinean politician who served as the third governor-general of Papua New Guinea from 1983 to 1989. He was also the second Speaker of the National Parliament of Papua New Guinea from 9 August 1977 to 14 March 1980.

Born in the Dogura area of mainland Milne Bay Province, he was a member of the Wedau people. He was employed as a primary school teacher beginning in 1949 until his election to the presidency of the Weraura Local Government Council in 1963. He was first elected to Parliament in 1975, and served as Speaker of that body from 1977 through 1980. He was named governor-general of Papua New Guinea on 1 March 1983, and served in that position until his resignation on February 27, 1990. Dibela died on 22 March 2002.

References 

1932 births
2002 deaths
Governors-General of Papua New Guinea
Speakers of the National Parliament of Papua New Guinea
Knights Grand Cross of the Order of St Michael and St George
People from Milne Bay Province
University of Auckland alumni